Marius Hauptmann (born 14 September 1999) is a German professional footballer who plays as a winger for VfB Lübeck.

Career
Hauptmann made his professional debut for Dynamo Dresden in the 2. Bundesliga on 23 December 2018, coming on as a substitute in the 90+3rd minute for Moussa Koné in the 3–1 away win against MSV Duisburg.

On 5 June 2019, Hauptmann joined FSV Zwickau on a two-year contract.

Personal life
Hauptmann's father, Ralf, is a former professional footballer and East German international, who also played for Dynamo Dresden. His older brother Niklas is also a professional footballer, having previously played for Dynamo Dresden.

References

External links
 
 Profile at kicker.de
 

1999 births
Living people
People from Leinefelde-Worbis
Footballers from Thuringia
German footballers
Association football midfielders
Dynamo Dresden players
FSV Zwickau players
VfB Lübeck players
2. Bundesliga players
3. Liga players
Regionalliga players